Meriana was a town of ancient Cilicia, inhabited in Roman times. The name does not occur among ancient authors but is inferred from epigraphic and other evidence.

Its site is located near Kiravga, Asiatic Turkey.

References

Populated places in ancient Cilicia
Former populated places in Turkey
Roman towns and cities in Turkey
History of Mersin Province